The name Lawin has been used for four tropical cyclones in the Philippines by PAGASA in the Western Pacific. It was a local name for a hawk.

 Typhoon Megi (2004) (T0415, 18W, Lawin) – moved through the Ryūkyū islands before passing between South Korea and Japan.
 Tropical Depression 14W (2008) (Lawin) – remained far offshore north of Luzon.
 Typhoon Jelawat (2012) (T1217, 18W, Lawin) – struck Japan.
 Typhoon Haima (2016) (T1622, 25W, Lawin) – powerful category 5 super typhoon that made landfall in Peñablanca, Cagayan of the Philippines and in Haifeng County, Shanwei in the Guangdong province of China.

The name Lawin was retired after the 2016 typhoon season, and was replaced with Leon in the 2020 season.

Pacific typhoon set index articles